The women's mass start race of the 2013–14 ISU Speed Skating World Cup 6, arranged in the Thialf arena, in Heerenveen, Netherlands, was held on 14 March 2014.

Francesca Lollobrigida of Italy won the race, while Irene Schouten of the Netherlands came second, and Ivanie Blondin of Canada came third.

Results
The race took place on Friday, 14 March, scheduled at 18:05.

References

Women mass start
6